Joonas Sundman (born 20 January 1998) is a Finnish professional footballer who plays for TPS, as a defender.

Club career
On 21 February 2022, Sundman signed a contract for the 2022 season with TPS.

References

1998 births
People from Seinäjoki
Living people
Finnish footballers
Aston Villa F.C. players
Seinäjoen Jalkapallokerho players
SJK Akatemia players
Turun Palloseura footballers
Veikkausliiga players
Kakkonen players
Association football defenders
Finnish expatriate footballers
Finnish expatriate sportspeople in England
Expatriate footballers in England
Sportspeople from South Ostrobothnia